Maro may refer to:

People
 Virgil (Publius Vergilius Maro; 70 BC–19 BC), ancient Roman poet 
 Maro (name), including a list of people with the given name or surname Maro
 Mark Rosewater (born 1967), American television writer and Magic: The Gathering designer
 K.Maro (born 1980), Lebanese-Canadian singer
 Maro (Lebanese singer) (born 2000), Lebanese singer-songwriter and YouTuber
 Maro (Portuguese singer) (born 1994), Portuguese singer

Fictional and mythological
 Maron (mythology), a companion of Dionysus and priest of Apollo in Greek mythology

Places
Marø Cliffs, in Antarctica
Maro Reef, in Hawaii
Maro River, a river in Merauke Regency, Indonesia
Maro, a village in Italy, part of the Castelnovo ne' Monti municipality
Maro, Benin

Other uses
 , of 315 tons (bm), was a Nantucket whaler launched at Mattapoisett, Massachusetts, that made four whaling voyages to the Pacific before she was condemned at Rio de Janeiro on 20 December 1828.
Maro (spider), a genus of spiders
A Tahitian men's loincloth, now superseded by the pareo